I'd Rather Eat Glass is the debut studio album by American actress, model and singer Bijou Phillips, released on May 11, 1999 by Almo Sounds. It also remains her only full-length music release to date. The album's title refers to her past as a fashion model, saying she would "rather eat glass" than go back to modeling. Produced by Jerry Harrison, I'd Rather Eat Glass is an alternative pop rock album with post-grunge, folk and trip hop elements. Phillips collaborated with a number of artists when writing songs for the album, including Eric Bazilian, Greg Wells, Dave Bassett, Howard Jones, and Jill Cunniff.

Upon its release, I'd Rather Eat Glass received mixed reviews from music critics, mostly criticising the work for being immature. Her musical style has been compared to Natalie Imbruglia or Kay Hanley of Letters to Cleo.

"When I Hated Him (Don't Tell Me)" was released as the lead single from the album. Directed by Lori Hoeft, the music video was shot in a trailer park where Phillips portrays a stripper who caught her boyfriend cheating on her. "Hawaii" was released as a promotional single. The song "Polite" was featured on the soundtrack to the film I Still Know What You Did Last Summer (1998).

Track listing

Personnel

 Bijou Phillips – vocals, guitar

Additional musicians
 Jerry Harrison – guitar
 Eric Bazilian – guitar
 Joe Gore – guitar  
 Michael Lockwood – guitar
 Dave Bassell – guitar
 Aishlia Harrison – background vocals
 Mackenzie Phillips – background vocals
 Frank Howard Swart – bass guitar
 Bernie Worrell – keyboards
 Patrick Warren – keyboards
 Prairie Prince – drums
 Stephanie Spruill – tambourine
 Philip Steir – loops
 Doug McKean – loops

Production
 Jerry Harrison – producer
 Doug McKean – engineer
 Mauricio Iragorri – assistant engineer
 Josh Richardson – assistant engineer
 Kent Matcke – assistant engineer
 Tom Lord-Alge – mixing
 Bob Ludwig – mastering
 Bob Bortnick – direction
 Robin Sloane – creative director
 Christy Bush – photography
 P. E. Raske – illustrations

References

External links
[ I'd Rather Eat Glass] at AllMusic

1999 debut albums
Albums produced by Jerry Harrison
Almo Sounds albums
Alternative rock albums by American artists
Pop rock albums by American artists